"Changer le monde" is a song by French singer Priscilla Betti. Released as a digital single on December 9, 2016, it reached number 120 in France.

The song is part of Priscilla Betti's sixth studio album, titled La vie sait, that appeared six months later (on May 19, 2017).

Track listing

Charts

References 

2016 songs
2016 singles
Priscilla Betti songs
Universal Music Group singles